Todor Kolev Kavaldzhiev (26 January 1934 – 6 February 2019) was Vice President of Bulgaria from 1997 until 2002. He was a partner to Petar Stoyanov, the 2nd President of Bulgaria. He was proven to be an anti-communist, due to being repressed during the communist era in Bulgaria. He was also an activist into restoring the BZNS Nikola Petkov.

Early life 
Todor Kavaldzhiev was born in Glavan, Tsardom of Bulgaria in 26 January 1934. He was a pro-BZNS activist during his teens, as he vowed to restore the Agrarian Youth Wing, which failed due to his arrest and imprisonment in 1952. He was first sent to the prison in Haskovo, then he spent 11 years in Pazardzhik and Stara Zagora. He was sent to Belene labour camp twice, where harsh labour was implemented. From 1952 to 1963, he was sued and then imprisoned. Todor was amnestied, then released out of prison. He worked as a builder for Sofstroi, a construction company located in Sofia from 1965 to 1966 for just one year.

During the period of 1966-1970, he followed and graduated economics in Svishtov. 3 years later, he graduated with a major in "Accounting and mechanization and automation of management work". During 1970-1973 and 1982-1983 he became a organizer-designer in the factory Сърп и чук, which translates to Sickle and hammer. in Stara Zagora. After that, to 1975, he worked in the forestry in his home village, Glavan.

From the periods of 1975 to 1982 he worked as chief accountant in the factory Lenin in Nikolaevo. During 1983-1990, he worked as an economist in the plant ОПОСО in Stara Zagora.

Politics 
In 1989, Kavaldzhiev addressed to the prime minister Georgi Atanasov via radio Svobodna Evropa to remove the law of the dispersal of the BZNS Nikola Petkov and amnesty to the sued BZNS members. He would be elected as the People's Representative of the VII Great National Assembly. To 1992, he was a member of the permanent presence of BZNS Nikola Petkov. From 1992, he assumed the duties of the secretary in the party. Kavaldzhiev was one of the first people to publicly address the mismanagement of the Union of Democratic Forces. He became a candidate for vice president of the UDF. Together with Petar Stoyanov, they won the 1996 elections in a runoff.

Vice President 
After becoming vice president, he began assisting Petar Stoyanov in his duties. He first warned about corrupt practices and that ex-communists most actively take control of enterprises and facilities in the process of privatization, often simply draining and destroying them.

References

Vice presidents of Bulgaria
1934 births
2019 deaths